The term score function may refer to:
 Scoring rule, in decision theory, measures the accuracy of probabilistic predictions
 Score (statistics), the derivative of the log-likelihood function with respect to the parameter
In positional voting, a function mapping the rank of a candidate to the number of points this candidate receives.

See also
 Scorer's functions